Mulberry Street is a 2006 American horror film directed by Jim Mickle, written by Nick Damici and Jim Mickle, and starring Nick Damici. It was released by After Dark Films as a part of their 8 Films to Die For 2007.

Plot 
Set during a long and hot summer day and night, a deadly infection breaks out on Mulberry Street in downtown Manhattan, causing humans to devolve into blood-thirsty monstrosities. Most of the information in the film comes from TV news broadcasts where as a result of constant urban decay, pollution and unbearable heat, the sewer rats of Manhattan are quickly spreading an unknown and horrible disease that causes its victims to mutate into ravenous and bloodthirsty rat-creatures. Once bitten, people quickly turn into rabid-like creatures with the appearance and eating habits of rats, and they only look at their former friends and neighbors as a source of food. Clutch, a retired boxer, nervously awaits the homecoming of his soldier daughter, Casey, recently back from a tour of duty in Iraq, but first he has to protect the other tenants as the rat-zombies are quickly infesting the entire neighborhood.

Initially emergency services and city authorities attempt to contain the spread by shutting down public transportation, and closing roads, but soon hospitals are inundated with the wounded, and the virus begins to spread island wide. By the time Clutch and the rest of the film's characters realize the severity of the situation, the infected have overrun much of the city and the streets are highly dangerous, with police seemingly overwhelmed and unable to respond. The survivors barricade themselves in their apartments as the news of the outbreak and subsequent quarantine of Manhattan breaks on TV and radio, waiting on promised rescue from the military, which the government promises will begin to restore order in Manhattan soon.

Cast 
 Nick Damici as Clutch
 Kim Blair as Casey
 Ron Brice as Coco
 Bo Corre as Kay
 Tim House as Ross
 Larry Fleischman as Charlie
 Larry Medich as Frank
 Javier Picayo as Otto
 Antone Pagán as Peter Pace
 John Hoyt as Big Vic
 Lou Torres as Larry the Bartender
 Larry Fessenden as Man behind the gate

Production 
Jim Mickle and Nick Damici met while working on a student thesis film. They came up with the idea of a back-to-basics zombie film called Dead of Night, but the estimated budget was too high for them. Tim House, who played the super, offered to put up $10,000, and the concept and style were reworked to fit around that budget. Eventually, the film grew from there and morphed into something less traditional. Many of the characters were based on people they knew from the real apartment building, and the actors were made up of friends and family. The film was shot in three and a half weeks.

Release 
Damici and Mickle had to fight to keep the title, as their representatives wanted to title it something more evocative of the current horror boom. Damici and Mikle, however, wanted to emphasize the theme of gentrification.

Mulberry Street premiered at the Stockholm International Film Festival on November 16, 2006. It got a theatrical release through After Dark Films on November 9, 2007. It was included in the After Dark Horrorfest 2007 DVD box set, released on March 18, 2008.

See also 
 List of ghost films

Reception 
Rotten Tomatoes, a review aggregator, reports that 70% of ten surveyed critics gave the film a positive review; the average rating was 6.9/10.  Jay Weissberg of Variety called it "a cut above most zero-budget horrors" that may become a cult film.  Bloody Disgusting rated it 2/5 stars and wrote, "The concept is solid but the execution is rife with problems."  Joshua Siebalt of Dread Central rated it 4/5 stars and recommended it to people who want "a tense and terrifying claustrophobic heart attack".  Jeremy Knox of Film Threat rated it 4.5/5 stars and wrote, "Off the top of my head, I can’t really think of another recent example of filmmaking in its purest form that tops Mulberry Street."  Scott Collura of IGN wrote that film rises above its limitations by its expertly realized characters and subtle themes.   Steve Biodrowski of Cinefantastique called it "half-brilliant and half-okay", criticizing the film's lighting and cinematography.  Ian Jane of DVD Talk rated it 3.5/5 stars and wrote, "Mulberry St. was a surprisingly engaging horror film. It moves at a great pace, it features some very strong performances, and while it might borrow from a few other films a little too much, at least it does so well."  Paul Pritchard of DVD Verdict called it "a surprisingly effective little shocker that, though far from perfect, is never dull and well worth 84 minutes of anybody's time."

References

External links 
 
 

2006 films
2006 horror films
American zombie films
Films shot in New York City
Films set in Manhattan
Films directed by Jim Mickle
American science fiction horror films
Films about viral outbreaks
2000s English-language films
2000s American films